Qingdao University (abbreviation: QDU/QDU Med school) is a key provincial research university located in Qingdao, Shandong, China. The university was first established in 1985. In 1993, the former Qingdao University, Qingdao Medical College, Shandong Textile Engineering College, and Qingdao Normal College, merged to form the new Qingdao University. At present, QDU is one of the best comprehensive universities in Shandong Province, recognized as a member of the national "Excellent Engineer Education and Training Program." With a strong profile in Medical Sciences, Textile and Design, Business, and liberal arts, QDU serves 35,000 full-time undergraduate students, 9,800 graduate students, and 1,600 international students.

History
In 1985, Qingdao University was established, with the educational goal of "high level distinctive university," and disciplines of arts, science, engineering, business and many other subjects. School construction and development were supported financially by the central government, and also academically supported by Nankai University, Tianjin University, University of Science and Technology of China, and Shandong University. In 1993, Qingdao University merged Shandong Textile Engineering Institute, Qingdao Medical College and Qingdao Normal College.

Academics

Overview
Qingdao University consists of 25 faculties and departments as well as a graduate school. Courses are offered in 11 main Academic disciplines: Philosophy, Economics, Law, Literature, History, Natural sciences, Engineering, Management, Medicine, Education and Military sciences. There are 104 Undergraduate degree programs, 209 master's degree programs, 127 Doctoral degree programs, and 15 post-doctorate mobile stations. In addition, there are 7 professional master's degree programs in Law, Business Management, Engineering, Clinical Medicine, Public Health, Dentistry and Public Administration respectively.

National Rankings 
In 2020:
 U.S. News & World Report = 78
 Wu Shulian = 87
 CRWU = 95
 ARWU = 108
 NSEAC = 101

Colleges and Schools 
Qingdao University is divided into 35 colleges and schools, besides a medical department.

These colleges and schools include:

School of Philosophy and History
School of Economics
School of Law
School of Marxism
School of Politics and Public Administration
College of Teacher Education
School of Physical Education
School of Chinese Language and Literature
School of Foreign Languages
School of Foreign Language Education
School of International Studies
School of Journalism and Communication
School of Mathematics and Statistics
School of Physical Sciences
School of Chemistry and Chemical Engineering
School of Life Sciences
School of Electromechanic Engineering
School Material Science and Engineering
School of Automation and Electrical Engineering
School of Electronic Information
School of Computer Science and Technology
School of Environmental Science and Engineering
School of Textile and Garment
School of Data Science and Software Engineering
School of Applied Technology
Medical Department
School of Basic Medicine
School of Dental Medicine
School of Public Health
School of Pharmacy
School of Nursing
School of Business
School of Tourism and Geographical Science 
School of Music
School of Fine Arts

Two hospitals belong to Qingdao University:
 The Affiliated Hospital of Qingdao University 
 The Affiliated Cardiovascular Disease Hospital of Qingdao University

International Education and Cooperation 
Qingdao University persists in implementing the strategy of open running and promoting of international exchanges and cooperation in all respects. It has established relations with 176 universities in over 20 countries and regions, including the USA, UK, Germany, France, Austria, Japan, Korea, Russia, Canada, Australia, New Zealand, Uruguay, etc. It has also developed over 60 education programs at various levels including teacher and student exchanges, joint training, and Chinese-foreign cooperatively-run education.

Qingdao University College of Medical Science is recognized by the World Health Organization and is listed in the World Directory of Medical Schools. Qingdao University is also authorized by the Ministry of Education of China to be one of the institutions of higher learning to offer courses in English for majors of Clinical Medicine.

Recruiting international students since 1987, Qingdao University was appointed as the "Chinese Educational Base" of the Overseas Chinese Affairs Office of the State Council in 2004, and the "Demonstration Base for International Students" of the Ministry of Education in 2014. Annually around 1,600 students from different countries and regions study at Qingdao University for both long and short-term programs. It has also established two foreign Confucius Institutes—Confucius Institute of Korea Sehan University and Confucius Institute of University of South Florida.

In 2007, the governments of Shandong Province, China and Bavaria, Germany established two special institutions—the Sino-German Cooperation Center of Colleges and Universities here at Qingdao University in Shandong and the Higher Education Center of Bavaria for Chinese Students at the University of Bayreuth, so as to further improve the educational cooperation between colleges and universities in these two areas. In 2009, Qingdao University became the "Training Base for Overseas Study" of the Chinese Service Center for Scholarly Exchange, Ministry of Education.

Campus

Qingdao University covers an area of 1.77 km² and includes three campuses in different parts of Qingdao, with the main campus located in the east part of Shinan District. Over 100 research labs, teaching and research facilities are well-equipped. The university library houses a collection of over 3,550,000 volumes.

Students and Faculty
It has about 37,000 students, from which over 5,000 are postgraduate students, and over 1,000 are international students. Since 1980, Qingdao University has received over 10,000 students from more than 60 countries. The university also has a group of reputed scholars known at home and abroad, of which 900 are professors. There are 23 academicians (including adjunct academicians) who are members of the Chinese Academy of Sciences and the Chinese Academy of Engineering.

Notable faculty 
Keum-Shik Hong

Affiliated Hospitals
Seven hospitals are affiliated with the university.
 The Affiliated Hospital of Qingdao University
 The Affiliated Cardiovascular Hospital of Qingdao University
 Qingdao Center Medical Group
 Qingdao Municipal Hospital
 Yantai Yuhuangding Hospital
 Qingdao Haici Medical Group
 Weihai Municipal Hospital

References

External links
Qingdao University Official Website 
Qingdao University Official Website 

 
Universities in China with English-medium medical schools
Universities and colleges in Qingdao
Educational institutions established in 1985
1985 establishments in China